Thailand has adopted ISO 8601 under national standard: TIS 1111:2535 in 1992.  However, in practice, there are some variations.

Date
Thailand uses the Thai solar calendar as the official calendar, in which the calendar's epochal date (Year zero) was the year in which the Buddha attained parinibbāna. This places the current year at 543 years ahead of the Gregorian calendar. The year 2023 CE is indicated as 2566 BE in Thailand. Despite adopting ISO 8601, Thai official date is still written in D/M/YYYY formats, such as 30 January 2566 BE (2023 CE) or 30/1/2566. Anno Domini or Common Era may be used in unofficial context, and is written in the same format (D/M/YYYY).

In full date format, the year is marked with "พ.ศ." (Buddhist era) or "ค.ศ." (lit. Christian era) to avoid confusion. As each calendar is 543 years apart, there is very little confusion in the contemporary context.

Time
There are two systems of telling time in Thailand. Official time follows a 24-hour clock. The 24-hour clock is commonly used in military, aviation, navigation, meteorology, astronomy, computing, logistical, emergency services, and hospital settings, where the ambiguities of the 12-hour clock cannot be tolerated.

In the second, everyday usage, the day is divided into four six-hour periods.  Additional words are used to identify the period specified (similar to a.m. or p.m. for a 12-hour system).

The distinguishing words are:
00:00-00:59 = เที่ยงคืน thiang khuen
01:00-05:59 = ตี ti
06:00-11:59 = โมงเช้า mong chao
12:00-12:59 = เที่ยง tiang
13:00-15:59 = บ่ายโมง bai mong
16:00-18:59 = โมงเย็น mong yen
19:00-23:59 = ทุ่ม thum

Thailand is in the UTC+07:00 time zone, which is also known as Indochina Time (ICT) and military time zone Golf.

See also
Thai calendar
Thai solar calendar
Thai six-hour clock

References

Time in Thailand
Thailand